James McIntyre (born 24 May 1972) is a Scottish football coach and former player.

McIntyre played mainly as a striker or as a left midfielder. During his playing career he played for Bristol City, Exeter City, Airdrieonians, Kilmarnock, Reading, Dundee United and Dunfermline Athletic.

He started his managerial career with Dunfermline Athletic followed by a scouting role at Bristol City. He then managed Queen of the South and Ross County, winning the Scottish League Cup in March 2016 with County. He was appointed Dundee manager in October 2018, but he was sacked in May 2019 after the club had been relegated. He returned to management in June 2022 with Cove Rangers, but was sacked six months later following poor form.

Playing career
Born in Alexandria, West Dunbartonshire, McIntyre began his senior career in England, after having unsuccessful trials with Hearts and Dundee United, and serving a three-year joinery apprenticeship, signing for Bristol City in 1991. While there, he had a loan spell with Exeter City in 1993. Later that year he returned to Scotland, signing for Airdrieonians where he impressed to earn a move to the top division. In March 1996 he joined Kilmarnock, going on to be part of their Scottish Cup-winning team in 1997. McIntyre scored the winning goal in the semi-final replay against Dundee United.

In March 1998, McIntyre was transferred to Reading for a fee of £440,000, and the following month appeared for Scotland B international team against Norway. He appeared as a late sub to replace Andy Smith. He played in the 2000/01 third-tier play off final defeat in extra time. This was his last game playing in English football. He returned to Scottish football, signing for Dundee United in July. Although his initial contract was for a two-year period, he twice extended his stay with the club and again was a goal scorer in a Scottish Cup semi-final winning team. It was announced by United manager Craig Brewster in April 2006 that McIntyre would be free to leave the club at the end of the season.

In July 2006, McIntyre signed for Dunfermline Athletic after negotiating a termination of his Dundee United contract. He scored a decisive penalty kick against Hibernian at Hampden Park in a Scottish Cup semi-final replay allowing Dunfermline to progress to the final with a 1–0 victory. After being appointed as Dunfermline manager at the start of 2008, McIntyre did not make a playing appearance for the club until November 2008 due to injury.

Coaching career

Dunfermline Athletic
McIntyre was appointed caretaker head-coach of Dunfermline Athletic on 4 December 2007, following the sacking of the incumbent manager of the club, Stephen Kenny. McIntyre's first match in charge was a home clash against Clyde on 8 December, when Dunfermline came from behind to claim a 1–1 draw, a result repeated the next week away at Partick Thistle, where Stephen Glass also missed a penalty. He was appointed as Dunfermline manager on a full-time basis on 3 January 2008, signing a two-and-a-half-year deal after an impressive run of four successive victories. After four straight wins, McIntyre was awarded the First Division Manager of the Month award for December. He again won the award, this time for Dunfermline's unbeaten run in September 2008. In the 2010–11 season, McIntyre led Dunfermline to the First Division Championship and promotion back to the Scottish Premier League, eventually winning the league by ten points, ahead of Raith Rovers. In three and a half years in the division with The Pars he was Manager of the Month five times. Dunfermline struggled in the 2011–12 Scottish Premier League season and were four points adrift at the bottom of the league table when he left the club in March 2012.

Bristol City
In April 2012, McIntyre was hired by Bristol City manager Derek McInnes to work as the club's first team coach until the end of the 2011–12 season. He had previously been doing some scouting work for Bristol City after being sacked by Dunfermline. McIntyre left Bristol City on 25 January 2013 by mutual consent.

Queen of the South
McIntyre was appointed Queen of the South manager on 27 June 2013, replacing Allan Johnston who moved to Kilmarnock on 24 June 2013. McIntyre appointed Gerry McCabe his assistant manager on 28 June 2013, having previously assisted him at Dunfermline.

Ross County
On 9 September 2014, McIntyre was appointed as manager of Scottish Premiership club Ross County. He led the club to their first major trophy, a Scottish League Cup, by winning the March 2016 final against Hibernian. McIntyre and his assistant Billy Dodds were sacked by County in September 2017.

Dundee
In August 2018, McIntyre rejected an approach from Falkirk regarding their managerial vacancy. He was appointed manager of Premiership club Dundee on 17 October 2018. McIntyre was sacked on 12 May 2019, after the club had been relegated from the Premiership. McIntyre managed just 4 wins in 31 games, which gave him the worst win percentage (12.90%) of any permanent manager in the club's history until Mark McGhee's stint three years later (7.14%).

Cove Rangers
McIntyre was appointed manager of newly promoted Scottish Championship club Cove Rangers in June 2022. He was sacked on 3 January 2023 following a 6–1 defeat to Inverness Caledonian Thistle the previous day.

Career statistics

Club

Managerial statistics

Honours and achievements

Player
Kilmarnock
Scottish Cup: 1996–97

Manager
Dunfermline Athletic
Scottish First Division: 2010–11

Ross County
Scottish League Cup: 2015–16

Individual
SFWA Manager of the Year (1): 2015/16
Scottish Premiership Manager of the Month (2): February 2015; March 2015
Scottish First Division Manager of the Month (5): December 2007; September 2008; November 2009; March 2011; April 2011

References

External links

1972 births
Airdrieonians F.C. (1878) players
Association football forwards
Bristol City F.C. players
Cove Rangers F.C. managers
Dundee United F.C. players
Dunfermline Athletic F.C. managers
Dunfermline Athletic F.C. players
Exeter City F.C. players
Kilmarnock F.C. players
Living people
People from Alexandria, West Dunbartonshire
Queen of the South F.C. managers
Reading F.C. players
Scotland B international footballers
Scottish Professional Football League managers
Scottish Football League managers
Scottish Football League players
Scottish football managers
Scottish footballers
Scottish Premier League managers
Scottish Premier League players
English Football League players
Dundee F.C. managers
Bristol City F.C. non-playing staff
Footballers from West Dunbartonshire